Bone Trouble (1940) is an animated short produced by Walt Disney, and directed by Jack Kinney. It stars Pluto and Butch the Bulldog, in the latter's first appearance.

Plot 
The short begins with Pluto waking up in his dog house. Pluto is hungry, but the birds have eaten his dish. He hears snoring over the nextdoor fence. Butch the Bulldog, who is sleeping nearby, has a bone which Pluto attempts to steal without awakening him. Pluto has to sneak past trees and tires to reach to the bone. After a couple of attempts, he successfully steals it. Before Pluto can enjoy the bone, an angry Butch shows up, having awoken some time before. A surprised Pluto takes the bone and Butch chases him.

Butch chases Pluto through town and into a deserted carnival. The chase continues when they passed by posters of a fat man and a belly dancer. They go through the Tunnel of Love ride where Pluto reverses the chase. Butch loses sight of Pluto when Pluto goes into a hall of mirrors. The mirrors cause Pluto to transform into various animals. Pluto has fun with the mirrors until he sees Butch again. Pluto takes advantage of one set of mirrors to successfully scare Butch off. He winks at his reflections and goes off with the bone.

Production 
The story was written by Carl Barks, who was soon to become a prolific and popular Disney comics artist and writer. This story partly inspired Barks' first Disney comics story, Pluto Saves the Ship, in 1942.

Cast 
 Lee Millar as Pluto
 Clarence Nash as Butch

Releases 
1940 – theatrical release

Home media 
The short was released on December 7, 2004, on Walt Disney Treasures: The Complete Pluto: 1930–1947.

Additional releases include:
2002 – Old Yeller DVD

References

External links 

1940 animated films
1940 short films
1940s Disney animated short films
American animated short films
Animated films without speech
Films directed by Jack Kinney
Films produced by Walt Disney
Films scored by Frank Churchill
Films scored by Paul Smith (film and television composer)
Films with screenplays by Carl Barks
Pluto (Disney) short films
RKO Pictures animated short films